is a Japanese-Canadian actor and playwright based in Vancouver, British Columbia. He has appeared in numerous high-profile films and television series shot in the Vancouver area, including The X-Files, Smallville, Caprica, Godzilla, The Man in the High Castle, Altered Carbon, iZombie, Legends of Tomorrow, Heroes Reborn and Kim's Convenience and was a writer on Da Vinci's City Hall. As a voice-over artist, he was the original English-language voice of Gihren Zabi in the Mobile Suit Gundam franchise and played Reed Richards in Fantastic Four: World's Greatest Heroes.

Kanagawa has also written several stage dramas. He won the Governor General’s Literary Award for English-language Drama for his 2017 play Indian Arm.

Early life and education
Kanagawa was born in Sapporo, Hokkaido, Japan and grew up in Guelph, Ontario; Sterling Heights, Michigan and Tokyo.

Kanagawa conducted his undergraduate studies in sculpting at Middlebury College, where he graduated in 1986. After dropping out of his initial graduate program, he re-enrolled at Simon Fraser University, where he completed his first play and completed his MFA in 1994.

He has lived in Vancouver since 1990.

Career
Kanagawa played Principal Kwan in TV series Smallville. He also voiced Gihren Zabi from Mobile Suit Gundam. He was also the voice of Mister Fantastic on Fantastic Four: World's Greatest Heroes. Kanagawa has the distinction of having played three different characters in the TV series The X-Files, appearing independently in seasons 2, 4 and 10. Besides acting, Kanagawa is also a playwright and screenwriter and teaches creative writing in the English department at Capilano University.

In 2015, he won the Jessie Richardson Theatre Award for Outstanding Script for his play Indian Arm, an adaptation of Henrik Ibsen's Little Eyolf. In 2017, Indian Arm won the Governor General's Award for English-language drama.

Filmography

Films

Television

Voice acting

Games

References

External links

1963 births
Living people
Canadian male actors of Japanese descent
Canadian male dramatists and playwrights
Canadian male voice actors
Canadian writers of Asian descent
Governor General's Award-winning dramatists
Japanese emigrants to Canada
Japanese expatriates in Canada
Male actors from Vancouver
Male voice actors from Sapporo
People from Sapporo 
Simon Fraser University alumni
Temple University Tyler School of Art alumni
Writers from Vancouver
20th-century Canadian dramatists and playwrights
20th-century Canadian male actors
21st-century Canadian dramatists and playwrights
21st-century Canadian male actors
20th-century Canadian male writers
21st-century Canadian male writers